Cheikh Matar Gueye (born 30 December 1986 in Thiès) is a Senegalese professional footballer who plays as a full back for French lower league side FCE Mérignac-Arlac.

References

External links 
  
 
 
 

1986 births
Living people
Sportspeople from Thiès
Senegalese footballers
Association football fullbacks
US Rail players
FC Metz players
Dynamo Dresden players
CFR Cluj players
2. Bundesliga players
Senegalese expatriate footballers
Expatriate footballers in Germany
Expatriate footballers in Romania